Degnepoll or Deknepollen is a neighborhood in Kinn Municipality in Vestland county, Norway. Before the Måløy Bridge was constructed, there was a ferry from Deknepollen to Måløy.
 
The name Deknepollen could be roughly translated as a "small fjord arm by the deacon".  Degnepoll is also a surname used by some families originating from the community or still living there.  The estimated population (2001) of Deknepollen is 245.

The main industry is fish processing and the main production facility produces fish oil and animal fodder. This factory was under construction during World War II and was destroyed during Operation Archery days before it could have been put into operation. Degnepoll has a combined post office, gas station, and fast food vendor in addition to an electronics shop, two car dealerships, and two supermarkets.

References

Villages in Vestland
Kinn